Harry Lewis may refer to:

 Harry S. Lewis (1861–1940), English Jewish author and communal worker
 Sinclair Lewis (Harry Sinclair Lewis, 1885–1951), American author
 Harry Lewis (boxer) (1886–1956), American World Champion Welterweight boxer
 H. H. Lewis (Harold Harwell Lewis, 1901–1985), American Communist poet
 Harry Lewis (actor) (1920–2013), American actor and restaurateur
 Harry R. Lewis (born 1947), American computer scientist, author, and university administrator
 Harry Lewis (footballer, born 1896) (1896–?), English footballer
 Harry Lewis (footballer, born 1910) (1910–2006), Welsh footballer 
 Harry Lewis (footballer, born 1997), English football goalkeeper
 Harry Lewis (footballer, born 2004), English footballer 
 Harry Lewis (Australian footballer) (1880–1946), Australian rules footballer
 Harry Lewis (politician) (born 1941), American politician
 Harry Lewis (musician) (1916–1998), English saxophonist and clarinetist
 Harry Lewis, also known as W2S or Wroetoshaw, member of the YouTube group Sidemen

See also
 "The Ballad of Harry Lewis", a comedic song from the album My Son, the Folk Singer, by Alan Sherman
 Henry Lewis (disambiguation)
 Harold Lewis (disambiguation)